Kristian Nairn (born 25 November 1975) is an actor and DJ from Lisburn, Northern Ireland. He is best known for his portrayal of Hodor in the HBO fantasy series Game of Thrones. More recently, he has played Wee John Feeney on the HBO Max series Our Flag Means Death.

Career
Nairn's portrayal of Hodor on Game of Thrones was his first acting role; Nairn earned enough to buy his mother a house. He is a progressive house/trance DJ, and used to be the resident DJ of Kremlin, a gay club in Belfast. Since Game of Thrones began, Nairn has toured as a DJ with "Rave of Thrones" using musical themes and costumes from the television series. At the end of 2017, he performed the first part of the Dimitri Vegas & Like Mike concerts in Antwerp. He was the DJ during the BlizzCon 2016 anniversary party and BlizzCon 2018 closing festivities. In October 2018, Kristian Nairn appeared in a commercial for eToro that was launched on YouTube, featuring the Internet meme HODL.

Nairn is an accomplished guitarist. He got the opportunity to play backstage with Megadeth during the Hellfest Open Air Festival in Clisson, France, during June 2018.

Personal life
In March 2014, Nairn publicly discussed his gay identity in an interview with a Game of Thrones fan site. He stated: "When you talk about 'the gay community,' you are talking about MY community.[...] I've never hidden my sexuality from anyone, my whole life in fact, and I've been waiting for someone to ask about it in an interview." He went on to say that his sexuality is "a very small part of who I am on the whole, but nonetheless, in this day and age, it's important to stand up and be counted." In 2015 Nairn clarified in an interview with Chicago Go Pride that it was really his "second coming out. I'd done it when I was 14 and didn't think I'd have to do it again. Especially since every single person in my life knew."

Filmography

Film

Television

Podcast

References

External links 

 

1975 births
Living people
Male television actors from Northern Ireland
People from Lisburn
Gay actors from Northern Ireland
DJs from Northern Ireland
LGBT DJs
21st-century male actors from Northern Ireland